Yesaul, osaul or osavul (from Turkic yasaul - chief), is a post and a rank in the Russian and Ukrainian Cossack units.

The first records of the rank imply that it was introduced by Stefan Batory, King of Poland in 1576.

Cossacks in Russia
There were different yesaul posts and ranks in Cossack Hosts in Imperial Russia:
Генеральный есаул (generalny yesaul) - General Yesaul
Походный есаул (pokhodny yesaul) - Campaign Yesaul
Войсковой есаул (voiskovoy yesaul) - Army Yesaul
Полковой есаул (polkovoy yesaul) - Regimental Yesaul
Артиллерийский есаул (artilleriysky yesaul) - Artillery Yesaul
Сотенный есаул (sotenny yesaul) - Company Yesaul (commander of a sotnia)
Станичный есаул (stanichny yesaul) - Yesaul of a stanitsa

Cossack Hetmanate and Sloboda Ukraine 
In Ukraine of the 17th and 18th centuries, an osaul was a military and administrative official performing the duties of aide-de-camp. The head of state, hetman, would appoint up to two osauls known as a General Osaul. There also was a Regimental Osaul as well as Company Osaul, with each regular cossack regiment and company except artillery having two of each. Beside them there were osauls under special assignments, one of them serving for General Obozny (quartermaster) who performed duties of a chief executive and was the second in importance after the Hetman.

General Osaul
A senior officer of a Hetmanate cossack army who was a member of the general officer staff.
Duties
supervising army's condition
leading large detachments (wartime)
managing muster rolls
directing the army engineers
commanding mercenary troops
sometimes serving as an acting hetman

Other duties consisted of being a hetman's envoy, supervised matters of internal security, conducted annual regimental musters and inspections. Among the notorious osauls were Petro Doroshenko, Demian Mnohohrishny, Ivan Mazepa, and Ivan Skoropadsky.

From 1798 to 1800 after the liquidation of the Zaporizhian Host, the rank of osaul was equated with the ranks of rittmeister in cavalry and captain in infantry.

Regimental Osavul
Regimental Osavul is an assistant Colonel in Military Affairs.

Sotenny Osavul
Sotenny Osavul is an assistant sotnik in Military Affairs.

References

External links
Osaul at the encyclopedia of Ukraine

Military organization of Cossacks
Military ranks of Russia
Military ranks of Ukraine